Glaucium cuneatum is a species of flowering plant in horned poppy genus which is native to Iraq.

References 

Papaveroideae
Flora of Iraq